The Bena are Bantu ethnolinguistic group based in the Njombe Region of south-central Tanzania who speak the Bantu Bena language. In 2001, the Bena population was estimated to number 670,000.

Clans include the Wabena of Njombe highlands and its offshoot, the Wabena of Ulanga.

See also
 Nena people
 List of ethnic groups in Tanzania

References

Ethnic groups in Tanzania
Indigenous peoples of East Africa